Yüksek Sadakat is a Turkish rock band that was formed in 1997 by Kutlu Özmakinacı, but became popular in early 2006 with their first album with the same name. The founder and bass player Kutlu Özmakinacı, used to be the editor of a music magazine called Blue Jean. Their music is a mix of pop rock with powerful beats utilizing Turkish instruments, keyboard and guitar solos.  The name of the band is a literal translation of the term "High Fidelity" (Hi-Fi) into Turkish.

Firstly established by the name "Filinta" the band change its name to "Yüksek Sadakat" in 2004. Founder and the songwriter of the band is the bassist Kutlu Özmakinacı.

On 1 January 2011, it was announced that the band will represent Turkey in Eurovision Song Contest 2011 with the song called "Live It Up", On May 10, Yüksek Sadakat failed to qualify for the Eurovision final making the band the first Turkish act to miss the final since the introduction of the semifinals in 2004.

Members

 Serkan Özgen – guitar
 Kutlu Özmakinacı – bass
 Uğur Onatkut – keyboards
 Deniz Alemdar – drums

Past members

 Selçuk Sami Cingi – vocal
 Cemil Demirbakan – vocal
 Kenan Vural – vocal
 Alpay Şalt – drums

Albums
 Yüksek Sadakat (2006)
 Katil & Maktûl (2008)
 Renk Körü (2011)
 IV (2014)
Rengarenk (2021)

Music videos
  (2005)
  (2005)
  (2005)
  (2008)
  (2009)
  (2011)
 Live It Up (2011)
 Fener (2013)

References

External links
 Official website

Turkish rock music groups
Eurovision Song Contest entrants of 2011
Eurovision Song Contest entrants for Turkey
Musical groups from Istanbul